Maria Carmela "Mela" Tunay is Filipina volleyball former player, actress, and TV host. She played for the UST Lady Tigresses in the UAAP and the Cignal HD Spikers in the PSL until 2016. She, then transferred and played for the Petron Blaze Spikers from 2017 to 2019.

Personal life 
Carmela Tunay, born in Mandaluyong and lives in Makati, attended St Paul College in Makati. She graduated at the University of Santo Tomas with a degree in AB Communication Arts in. Tunay finished her Marketing master's degree in UST, during her last playing season, UAAP season 78.

Career 
Tunay was a member of the UST Golden Tigresses, the collegiate varsity volleyball team of UST which plays in the UAAP Volleyball tournament. The Golden Tigresses finished 6th and 5th place in UAAP Season 76 and 77 respectively. In 2015, she joined the Cignal HD Spikers which plays in the Philippine Super Liga. During a game between the TIP and UST in the Shakeys V-League Collegiate Conference 2015, Tunay suffered a nose injury. Two weeks later she was back in action when UST played against the UP Lady Maroons, and in the semifinals against ADMU Lady Blue Spikers and eventually lost to FEU Tamaraws on the third place game.

With Petron Blaze Spikers, she won the 2017 PSL Invitational Cup silver medal, 2017 PSL All-Filipino Conference gold medal and 2017 PSL Grand Prix Conference silver medal.

Clubs 
  UST Golden Tigresses (2013–2016)
  Cignal HD Spikers (2015)
  Petron Blaze Spikers (2017–2019)
  Motolite Volleyball Team (2020)
  Peak Form Lady Spikers (2021)

Awards

Clubs
 2017 Philippine SuperLiga Invitational Cup –  Runner-Up, with Petron Blaze Spikers
 2017 Philippine SuperLiga All-Filipino Conference –  Champion, with Petron Blaze Spikers
 2017 Philippine SuperLiga Grand Prix –  Runner-Up, with Petron Blaze Spikers
 2018 Philippine SuperLiga Grand Prix –  Champion, with Petron Blaze Spikers
 2018 Philippine SuperLiga Grand Prix –  Runner-Up, with Petron Blaze Spikers

References 

1995 births
Filipino television actresses
Filipino women's volleyball players
Living people
University Athletic Association of the Philippines volleyball players
University of Santo Tomas alumni
Wing spikers
People from Mandaluyong
Volleyball players from Metro Manila
Filipino LGBT sportspeople
LGBT volleyball players
21st-century Filipino LGBT people